Frank Searle (born Eric Frank Searle; 18 March 1921 – 26 March 2005) was a photographer who studied the disputed existence of the Loch Ness Monster. He took up residence at Loch Ness in 1969 living a frugal existence in a tent looking for definitive proof of the monster's existence. Eventually photographs began to appear from 1972 onwards and earned Frank a degree of fame as a monster hunter.

However, as the detail of the pictures increasingly improved with time, people began to suspect they were fakes. The matter was finally exposed in 1976 when the Scottish Sunday Mail carried a centre-page article proving that one of his photographs was taken from a postcard showing an Apatosaurus. Another picture was also proven to be a wooden post at a pier that was covered with cloth to make it monster-like.

As his reputation declined, he was involved with some skirmishes with other monster researchers which eventually led to a failed molotov cocktail attack on one of their boats. Searle denied any involvement in the matter and was never charged over it. Eventually he left the loch for good in the early 1980s to allegedly embark on a treasure hunting expedition.

Some years later he was eventually tracked down by Andrew Tullis for his documentary The Man who Captured Nessie. Searle had been living in a bedsit in Fleetwood, Lancashire, but had died only a few weeks before.

Most Nessie analysts agree that although he added some colour and personality to the Loch Ness story, his contribution overall was negative.

External links
Obituary
Article on Searle's death
Searle's career and photographs

1921 births
2005 deaths
20th-century British photographers
Photographers from Lancashire
Cryptozoologists
Hoaxes in the United Kingdom
Loch Ness Monster
1972 hoaxes